The first group stage of the 2001–02 UEFA Champions League was the first stage of the competition proper, following the qualifying phase. 16 winners from the third qualifying round, 10 champions from countries ranked 1–10, and six second-placed teams from countries ranked 1–6 were drawn into eight groups of four teams each. Play began on 11 September 2001 and ended on 31 October 2001, when the top two teams in each group advanced to the second group stage, and the third-placed team in each group dropped down to the Third Round of the 2001–02 UEFA Cup.

Due to the September 11 attacks, matches scheduled to take place on 12 September were postponed until 10 October. Matches scheduled on the day of the attacks went ahead with a minute's silence taking place before kick-off.

Seeding
Seeding was determined by the UEFA coefficients. Clubs from the same association were split between groups A–D and E–H, ensuring that they not play on the same day if possible.

Groups

Group A

Group B

Group C

Group D

Group E

Group F

Group G

Group H

References

Group Stage 1
2001-02 1